Unmesh Desai is a British politician. A member of the Labour Party, he has represented City and East in the London Assembly since 2016. He served as Councillor on the London Borough of Newham from 1998 until 2018, representing East Ham Central from 2002 onwards.

Background
Desai has resided in East London for more than 30 years. He previously trained and worked as a solicitor. He is a trustee of the West Ham United Foundation, President of the Newham Cricket Club and a Vice-President of the East London Rugby Club. Desai acted as election agent for Stephen Timms, the Labour MP for East Ham. He has written for The Guardian on the Prevent strategy. Desai has also been the Chair of the Newham Fabian Society for several years.

Career
Desai was first elected to the Newham London Borough Council in 1998, representing St Stephens ward. He was subsequently elected as a councillor for East Ham Central in 2002 following a boundary change. He continued being a councillor for East Ham Central until 2018 when he stood down to focus on his London Assembly work. During his time on Newham Council he served as Cabinet Member for Crime and Anti-Social Behaviour.

In May 2016, Desai was elected to the London Assembly succeeding John Biggs as the member for City and East, winning nearly 58% of the vote. He was subsequently reselected as Labour candidate for the constituency for the 2020 London Assembly election.

Desai is Labour's London Assembly spokesperson on Policing and Crime and Chair of both the London Assembly Audit Panel and the Police and Crime Committee. During his time on the Assembly, he has campaigned on issues including police pay and conditions, anti-fascism, and hate crime at football grounds.

References

Living people
Labour Members of the London Assembly
Councillors in the London Borough of Newham
Year of birth missing (living people)
British politicians of Indian descent